The 2018–19 Lehigh Mountain Hawks men's basketball team represented Lehigh University during the 2018–19 NCAA Division I men's basketball season. The Mountain Hawks, led by 12th-year head coach Brett Reed, played their home games at Stabler Arena in Bethlehem, Pennsylvania as members of the Patriot League.

Previous season
The Mountain Hawks finished the 2017–18 season 16–14, 11–7 in Patriot League play to finish in a tie for third place. They lost in the quarterfinals of the Patriot League tournament to Boston University.

Offseason

Departures

2018 recruiting class

2019 recruiting class

Roster

Schedule and results

|-
!colspan=9 style=| Non-conference regular season

|-
!colspan=9 style=| Patriot League regular season

|-
!colspan=9 style=| Patriot League tournament

Source

References

Lehigh Mountain Hawks men's basketball seasons
Lehigh
Lehigh
Lehigh